The COSAFA Under 17 Challenge Cup is an association football tournament for teams from Southern Africa organized by COSAFA.

Participants

Teams that can technically enter are:

Results

References

 
COSAFA competitions
Under-17 association football